The Goshute Valley is an endorheic landform of the Great Basin in Elko County, Nevada, United States.

Description
The towns of Oasis and Cobre are in the valley's north, and the central and north of the valley contains broken flatlands, with short washes draining from the surrounding mountain ranges.

Interstate 80 crosses the valley and has a junction with State Route 233 at Oasis. The Nevada Northern Railway traverses the valley north from Ely and intersects the Western Pacific Railroad at Shafter and continues on north to a connection with the Southern Pacific Railroad at Cobre.

The southern  of the valley turns southwest and includes the northeast-flowing Nelson Creek which drains into a flatland sink.  Currie is in the Steptoe Valley to the southwest end of the Goshute Valley adjacent a drainage divide between the north flowing Nelson Creek and the south flowing drainage into the intermittent Goshute Lake near the ghost town of Goshute. The Goshute Canyon Wilderness lies to the southwest in White Pine County.

Salt desert
The Goshute Valley includes the largest of the Nevada salt desert ecoregions.

See also
 List of valleys of Nevada

References

External links

Great Basin deserts
Valleys of Elko County, Nevada
Valleys of Nevada
Valleys of the Great Basin